Eynatten is a village in the Belgian municipality of Raeren, part of the German-speaking Community of Belgium. Around half of the population are non-Belgians, most of them Germans.

Eynatten is located on route N68 between Aachen, Germany and the German-speaking Belgian town of Eupen. Frequent bus services run between Aachen and Eupen, stopping at various places in Eynatten en route.

External links
 

Raeren
Belgium–Germany border crossings